Mulinia is a genus of small to medium-sized saltwater and estuarine clams, marine bivalve mollusks in the family Mactridae.

Species
Species within the genus Mulinia include:
 Mulinia cleryana
 Mulinia coloradoensis – the Colorado Delta clam
 Mulinia edulis
 Mulinia lateralis
 Mulinia pallida

References

Mactridae
Bivalve genera